Los Campos is one of seven parishes (administrative divisions) in the Corvera de Asturias municipality, within the province and autonomous community of Asturias, in northern Spain. 

The population is 3,102 (INE 2011).

Villages
Ablaneda
Entrevías
La Rozona
Los Campos
Santa Cruz

Parishes in Corvera de Asturias